Cashin is a surname of Irish origin. Notable people with the surname include: 
 Alice Cashin (1870–1939), Australian nurse
 Bonnie Cashin (c. 1907–2000), American designer
 Eiran Cashin Derby County Football player 
 Edward J. Cashin (1927–2007), American historian
 Fergus Cashin (1924–2005), British historian 
 John L. Cashin Jr. (1928–2011), American dentist, civil rights campaigner, and politician
 His daughter Sheryll, Law professor at Georgetown University Law Center
 John M. Cashin (1892–1970), United States federal judge
 Michael Patrick Cashin (1864–1926), Newfoundland businessman and politician
 Pat Cashin (1968–2016), American clown and actor
 Patrick H. Cashin (1851–1926), American businessman and politician
 Major Peter John Cashin (1890–1977) Canadian businessman, soldier and politician
 Richard Cashin, lawyer, former Canadian politician and trade union leader

Surnames of Irish origin